The Cycle of Days and Seasons is a full-length album by the Leeds-based band Hood. Both the LP and CD versions were released on Domino Records in 1999.

Critical reception
Reviewing a reissue, Pitchfork wrote: "Voices echo and loop, a slightly fuzzy recording of church bells recurs at points during the album, and the crackle and buried beats of 'In Iron Light' implicitly suggest what else was happening in the sonic universe."

Track listing

References

External links 
Hood Homepage
Domino Records

1999 albums
Domino Recording Company albums
Hood (band) albums